The George Szekeres Medal is awarded by the Australian Mathematical Society for outstanding research contributions over a fifteen-year period. This award, established in 2001, was given biennially in even-numbered years until 2021 and has since been given annually, for work that has been carried out primarily in Australia 

This medal commemorates the work of the late George Szekeres, FAA, for his achievements in number theory, combinatorics, analysis, and relativity.

Winners

See also

 List of mathematics awards

References

Mathematics awards